Concurso Nacional de Belleza Ecuador is a national beauty pageant held annually in Ecuador. Initially, the contest was named Miss World Ecuador in 2013 up to 2020 when it was renamed Consurso Nacional de Belleza Ecuador. The winner is the Miss World Ecuador and is the national representative at Miss World in the year she has been chosen, except in 2020 due to COVID-19 pandemic.

History

The very first winner elected by Miss World Ecuador organization was Laritza Párraga from Santo Domimgo province through 2013. Although Miss World Ecuador organization has the rights to send a delegate to Miss World, Ecuador has been competing at Miss World since 1960 under the Miss Ecuador beauty pageant, which had the rights until 2012. After Miss Ecuador Organization lost the franchise to Miss World, Julián Pico acquired the rights to send a contestant to the international pageant through the national pageant Miss World Ecuador, starting in 2013.
 
Representatives from the 24 provinces that make up Ecuador compete annually for the national title of Miss World Ecuador among others such as Miss Supranational Ecuador and Miss Grand Ecuador. Furthermore, the organization sent the Ecuadorian's delegate to Miss World Cup 2014 where it placed 2nd Runner-up with the participation of Laritza Párraga.

Titleholders

Winners of Miss World Ecuador under Tahiz & Miguel Panus direction from 2017.

Miss World Ecuador selected under Miss Ecuador Organization
Before 2013 the 1st Runner-up of Miss Ecuador awarded as Miss Ecuador Mundo and represented Ecuador at Miss World. Since 2013 the Miss World Ecuador sends winners to Miss World. On occasion, when the winner does not qualify (due to age) for either contest, a runner-up is sent.

After competing in Miss World 2012 she resigned the title, but anyone took over the crown due the change of franchise holder.

Provincial rankings

 Ranking of representatives to Miss World from Miss Ecuador plus Miss World Ecuador.

See also
Miss Ecuador
Miss Grand Ecuador
Miss Teen Ecuador
Mister Ecuador
Miss Earth Ecuador

References

External links
Official Miss World Ecuador website
Past titleholders

 
Beauty pageants in Ecuador
Ecuadorian awards